"Goodbye Yellow Brick Road" is a ballad written by English musician Elton John and songwriter Bernie Taupin, and performed by John. It is the title track on John's album of the same name. The titular road is a reference to L. Frank Baum's The Wizard of Oz film and book series.

The song has been widely praised by critics; some consider it a strong contender for John's finest song ever. Rolling Stone listed the song at No. 390 of its 500 greatest songs of all time in 2010. In the US, it was certified gold on 4 January 1974 and platinum on 13 September 1995 and 2× platinum on 2 March 2020 by the RIAA.

Composition
The lyrics, written by Taupin, contain autobiographical elements, referring to his childhood on a farm in Lincolnshire. The song expresses a desire to get back to one's "roots", a common theme of Taupin's early lyrics.

In 2014, Taupin reflected, "It's been said many times, but Goodbye Yellow Brick Road is a cinematic album. The lyrics to the title track do say that I want to leave Oz and get back to the farm. I think that's still my M.O. these days. I don't mind getting out there and doing what everybody else was doing, but I always had to have an escape hatch."

In 2020, he added, "I don't believe I was ever turning my back on success or saying I didn't want it. I just don't believe I was ever that naïve. I think I was just hoping that maybe there was a happy medium way to exist successfully in a more tranquil setting. My only naiveté, I guess, was believing I could do it so early on. I had to travel a long road and visit the school of hard knocks before I could come even close to achieving that goal."

Release and reception

Release
The song was released in 1973 as the album's second single and entered the top ten in both the United Kingdom and the United States. It was one of John's biggest hits, and quickly surpassed his previous single, "Saturday Night's Alright for Fighting", in both sales and popularity, following its release.

Critical response
"Goodbye Yellow Brick Road" received generally positive response from music critics. Janis Schacht of Circus describes it as "delicate and beautiful". AllMusic writes that the song is "a vocal triumph" and a "pinnacle of its style". Billboard stated that the song's "sonic impression is still strong and haunting" and the "blending of voices with strings on the bridges is beautiful," although the lyrics are sometimes difficult to understand.  Cash Box described the song as "soft, melodic pop that’s going to impress folks all over again as to [John's] performing abilities," going on to say that "Bernie Taupin’s lyrics are again highly poetic and blend perfectly with Elton's music."

In 2010, Rolling Stone magazine ranked it No. 390 in their list of the 500 Greatest Songs of All Time.

In 2018, The Guardian ranked the song number six on their list of the 50 greatest Elton John songs, and in 2022, Billboard ranked the song number four on their list of the 75 greatest Elton John songs.

Chart performance
In Canada, the single reached No. 1 on the RPM 100 national singles chart on 22 December 1973 and held the position for one week, making it John's third No. 1 in the year 1973 in that country (following "Crocodile Rock" and "Daniel"). On the US Hot 100, it went to No. 2, behind both "Top of the World" by the Carpenters and "The Most Beautiful Girl" by Charlie Rich. On the US Easy Listening chart, it rose to No. 7 and spent 18 weeks on the charts. In Ireland, it reached No. 4; in the UK it peaked at No. 6.

B-side
The song's flip side was originally titled "Screw You", although the US release re-titled the song "Young Man's Blues" so that it would not offend American record buyers.

Live
John's One Night Only: The Greatest Hits Live at Madison Square Garden featured this song performed as a duet with Billy Joel.

"Goodbye Yellow Brick Road" is still regularly included in John's live performances, and John named his farewell tour after the song, naming it the Farewell Yellow Brick Road Tour.

Personnel
 Elton John – piano, vocals
 Davey Johnstone – Leslie electric guitar, backing vocals
 Dee Murray – bass, backing vocals
 Nigel Olsson – drums, backing vocals
 Del Newman – orchestral arrangement

Charts and certifications

Weekly singles charts

Year-end charts

Certifications

References

1973 songs
1973 singles
Elton John songs
Songs with music by Elton John
Songs with lyrics by Bernie Taupin
Song recordings produced by Gus Dudgeon
Cashbox number-one singles
RPM Top Singles number-one singles
Pop ballads
Rock ballads
1970s ballads
DJM Records singles
MCA Records singles
Songs about roads
Glam rock songs